American Bridge 21st Century or AB PAC is a liberal American Super PAC that supports Democratic candidates and opposes Republican candidates. It was founded by David Brock in 2010 and is associated with Media Matters for America. It is an opposition research hub for the Democratic Party. The group physically tracks and monitors Republican candidates and officials and uses social media to deploy its findings.

Methods
American Bridge PAC employs over 50 trackers to follow and record Republican candidates across the country. These trackers are equipped with high-tech recording gear and are assigned Republican targets to follow and record. According to The New York Times, the organization "aims to record every handshake, every utterance by Republican candidates ... looking for gotcha moments that could derail political ambitions or provide fodder for television advertisements by liberal groups." USA Today described the group's goal as "uncovering an unguarded moment, a controversial position, a gaffe or flip-flop, anything that can be used to torpedo a political foe's campaign." The organization compiles opposition research dossiers on the Republican candidates they are targeting. The group's opposition dossier on Mitt Romney was 2,500 pages long. It has attempted to tie Republican candidates to the political activities of the Koch brothers.

In 2016, American Bridge discovered that the Trump Institute's book was plagiarized, with at least 20 pages coming from a 1995 Success article. In 2018, it spent $20.9 million, mostly on employee salaries including the opposition researchers.

Donors
American Bridge PAC is largely funded by wealthy Democratic donors, labor unions, and other PACs (Sixteen Thirty Fund/Arabella Advisors). The largest donors of the 2020 United States presidential election cycle include billionaire Stephen Mandel, Bain Capital co-founder Joshua Bekenstein, real estate Titan George M. Marcus, and LinkedIn co-founder Reid Hoffman. In past election cycles billionaire George Soros and others helped the then fledging Super PAC in 2012.

References

External links
 
 
 American Bridge 21st Century at OpenSecrets.org

United States political action committees
Organizations based in Washington, D.C.
Opposition research
Organizations established in 2010
Progressive organizations in the United States
2010 establishments in Washington, D.C.